Khadambi Asalache (28 February 1935 – 26 May 2006) was a Kenyan poet and author who settled in London, England. He was later a civil servant at HM Treasury. He left his lavishly decorated South London terraced house, 575 Wandsworth Road, to the National Trust.

Early life
Asalache was born in Kaimosi in western Kenya, the eldest child of the local chief. In his youth, Asalache read Shakespeare while herding cattle. He was educated at Mang'u High School, run by the Holy Ghost Fathers, where he was given the Christian name Nathaniel, and then studied architecture at the Royal Technical College in Nairobi (later to become the University of Nairobi).

After studying fine art in Rome, Geneva and Vienna, he moved to London in 1960, where he taught Swahili at the Berlitz School, and worked for the BBC African Service. Though with great intellectual talent, Asalache was humble and down-to-earth. Whenever he visited his rural community in Kenya, he would freely mix with the community members and look out for a number of his youth friends.

Writing career
He was a pioneer of modern Kenyan literature in English. His first novel, The Calabash of Life, published in 1967, focused on Kenyan tribesmen opposing a usurper and quickly became an international success. He also wrote and produced an episode of the BBC series Danger Man. Extracts from his second novel, The Latecomer, with animal characters, were broadcast by the BBC African Service in January 1971.

He also wrote poetry that was published in literary journals. A collection of his poems, Sunset in Naivasha, was published by Eothen Books in 1973. His poem "Death of a Chief" was included in the Penguin Book of Modern African Poetry in 1995.

Asalache received an MPhil in philosophy of mathematics from Birkbeck College in the 1970s, and became a civil servant at the Treasury.

575 Wandsworth Road
Buying a modest "two-up two-down" Georgian terraced house in London's Wandsworth Road in 1981, Asalache paid less than the asking price of £31,000. 575 Wandsworth Road was in Lambeth on the number 77 bus route, allowing him to commute almost direct to his workplace. The property was in a poor state of repair when he bought it, having previously been occupied by squatters. For 20 years, he decorated it internally with Moorish-influenced fretwork that he cut by hand from discarded pine doors and wooden boxes. The intricate woodwork was augmented by illustrations of African wilderness, and his collection of 19th-century English lustreware pottery.

The house was shown in The World of Interiors in July/August 1990, and the Sunday Telegraph Magazine in February 2000. Tim Knox, director of Sir John Soane's Museum, wrote about the house in Nest in late 2003, describing it as "an extremely serious and carefully worked out exercise in horror vacui, taking its inspiration from the Mozarabic reticulations of the Moorish kingdoms of Granada." The work takes inspiration from the Great Mosque of Cordoba, the Alhambra and Generalife in Granada, doors in Zanzibar, panelled interiors in Damascus, and the waterside houses or yalı in Istanbul.

Personal life, death and legacy
Asalache met his partner, Scottish basket-maker Susie Thomson, in 1989. He was an accomplished chef for their dinner parties, importing dried tuna that was flown in from Mombasa.

Although a non-smoker, he died of lung cancer in 2006 and was survived by Susie Thomson. He left 575 Wandsworth Road to the National Trust in his will. The National Trust accepted the property, deciding that it was "of national significance and should be safeguarded ... a great work of art and an important part of our built heritage", subject to raising an endowment of £3m to £5m for its maintenance.

The National Trust obtained museum status for the house in 2019.

References

External links
 "Khadambi Asalache's bequest to the National Trust", The Guardian, 20 January 2009.

1935 births
2006 deaths
20th-century male writers
20th-century novelists
20th-century poets
Alumni of Birkbeck, University of London
Alumni of Mang'u High School
Deaths from lung cancer in England
Kenyan emigrants to the United Kingdom
Kenyan novelists
Kenyan poets
People from Western Province (Kenya)
University of Nairobi alumni